Johannes Frederik Huisamen (born ) is a South African rugby union player who plays for the  in the Currie Cup and the Rugby Challenge. His regular position is lock.

Rugby career

Huisamen was born in Malmesbury, but grew up in the Eastern Cape. He was included in the  squads for the 2012, 2013 and 2014 Varsity Cup competition, and played for Port Elizabeth Police in the Gold Cup in 2015 (when it was known as the Community Cup) and 2016.

In 2016, Huisamen was named in the  squad for the Currie Cup Premier Division. He made his first class debut by starting in the Kings' match against  in Kimberley, and made a second appearance as a replacement in their home match against the  just four days later.

References

South African rugby union players
Living people
1989 births
Malmesbury
Rugby union locks
Eastern Province Elephants players
Rugby union players from the Western Cape